Anchorage is an unincorporated community in Atascosa County, in the U.S. state of Texas. It is located within the San Antonio metropolitan area.

History
A post office was established at Anchorage in 1889 and remained in operation until 1935. The community was so named when an early settler announced his intent to "anchor here". A Scottish sailor named Thomas Whittet bought  of land from Francisco De La Garza in 1889. The town had a general store the next year. It had another general store and a gin six years later, alongside a population of 15. Its population jumped to 120 by 1914 and had a physician named M.J. Whittet. Anchorage had only one business in operation in 1933 and then had a cemetery, a church, a factory, and a few scattered houses in the 1940s. The factory was not included on county maps in 1960, although the community continued to be listed on county maps in 1990 but with no further information.

Geography

Education
Today the community is served by the Poteet Independent School District.

References

Unincorporated communities in Atascosa County, Texas
Unincorporated communities in Texas